The 1957–58 OB I bajnokság season was the 21st season of the OB I bajnokság, the top level of ice hockey in Hungary. Five teams participated in the league, and Ujpesti Dozsa SC won the championship.

Standings

External links
 Season on hockeyarchives.info

Hun
OB I bajnoksag seasons
1957–58 in Hungarian ice hockey